ISO/IEC 8859-5:1999, Information technology — 8-bit single-byte coded graphic character sets — Part 5: Latin/Cyrillic alphabet, is part of the ISO/IEC 8859 series of ASCII-based standard character encodings, first edition published in 1988. It is informally referred to as Latin/Cyrillic. It was designed to cover languages using a Cyrillic alphabet such as Bulgarian, Belarusian, Russian, Serbian and Macedonian but was never widely used. It would also have been usable for Ukrainian in the Soviet Union from 1933 to 1990, but it is missing the Ukrainian letter ge, ґ, which is required in Ukrainian orthography before and since, and during that period outside Soviet Ukraine. As a result, IBM created Code page 1124.

ISO-8859-5 is the IANA preferred charset name for this standard when supplemented with the C0 and C1 control codes from ISO/IEC 6429.

The 8-bit encodings KOI8-R and KOI8-U, CP866, and also Windows-1251 are far more commonly used. In contrast to Windows-1252 and ISO 8859-1, Windows-1251 is not closely related to ISO 8859-5. The Windows code page for ISO-8859-5 is code page 28595 a.k.a. Windows-28595.

The Unicode main Cyrillic block uses a layout based on ISO-8859-5.

Codepage layout

Differences from ISO 8859-1 are shown with its Unicode equivalent code point.

History and related code pages

The ECMA-113 standard has been equivalent to ISO-8859-5 since its second edition, its first edition (ISO-IR-111) having been an extension of the earlier KOI-8 (defined by GOST 19768-74), which lays out the Russian letters in the same way as their ASCII Roman equivalents where possible. The initial draft of ISO-8859-5 (DIS-8859-5:1987) followed ISO-IR-111, but was revised after GOST 19768-74 was replaced by the new ISO-IR-153 in 1987, which re-arranged the Russian letters into alphabetical order (except for Ё). ISO-IR-153 contains the Russian letters, including Ё, and the non-breaking space and soft hyphen, whereas the full Cyrillic set of ISO-8859-5 is also called ISO-IR-144.

Possibly as a consequence of this confusion,  erroneously lists yet another code page as "ISO-IR-111", combining the letter order and case order of ISO-8859-5 with the row order of ISO-IR-111 (and consequently compatible with neither in practice, but in practice partially compatible with Windows-1251).

IBM Code page 915 is an extension of ISO/IEC 8859-5, adding some semigraphic and other symbols in the C1 area. IBM Code page 1124 is mostly identical to ISO-8859-5, but replaces ѓ with ґ for Ukrainian use.

ISO-IR-200, "Uralic Supplementary Cyrillic Set", was registered in 1998 by Everson Gunn Teoranta (which Michael Everson was a director of, prior to the founding of Evertype in 2001), and changes several of the non-Russian letters in order to support the Kildin Sami, Komi and Nenets languages, not supported by ISO-8859-5 itself. Michael Everson also introduced Mac OS Barents Cyrillic for the same languages on classic Mac OS.

ISO-IR-201, "Volgaic Supplementary Cyrillic Set", was similarly introduced by Everson Gunn Teoranta in order to support the Chuvash, Komi, Mari and Udmurt languages, spoken in the titular republics of Russia.

References

External links
ISO-IR 144 Cyrillic part of the Latin/Cyrillic Alphabet (May 1, 1988, from ISO 8859-5 2nd version)
ISO/IEC 8859-5:1999
 Standard ECMA-113: 8-Bit Single-Byte Coded Graphic Character Sets - Latin/Cyrillic Alphabet 3rd edition (December 1999)

ISO/IEC 8859
Computer-related introductions in 1988